Marulanda is a town and municipality in the Colombian Department of Caldas.

Municipalities of Caldas Department